Zeina Zein (born 2 December 2004 in Alexandria) is an Egyptian professional squash player. As of September 2022, she was ranked number 89 in the world.

References

2004 births
Living people
Egyptian female squash players
21st-century Egyptian women